Judge Allen may refer to:

Arenda Wright Allen (born 1960), judge of the United States District Court for the Eastern District of Virginia
Charles M. Allen (1916–2000), judge of the United States District Court for the Western District of Kentucky
Florence E. Allen (1884–1966), judge of the United States Court of Appeals for the Sixth Circuit
Michael P. Allen (born 1967), judge of the United States Court of Appeals for Veterans Claims
William J. Allen (1829–1901), judge of the United States District Court for the Southern District of Illinois

See also
Justice Allen (disambiguation)